Ice Line Quad Rinks is an ice arena in West Chester, Pennsylvania, United States. The building consists of four NHL-regulation ice surfaces- each with a seating capacity of 500, concession area, and other amenities.

The rink is the home of a number of programs, including:

West Chester University of Pennsylvania men's ice hockey teams competing at the ACHA Division I level in the ESCHL and JV team at the ACHA DII level in the Colonial States College Hockey Conference (CSCHC). Hosted the latter's league playoffs in February 2016. 
West Chester University women's ice hockey team competing at the ACHA Women's DII level in College Hockey East (CHE).
Philadelphia Junior Flyers Tier III Jr. A ice hockey team playing in the Eastern Hockey League (EHL).

In addition Ice Line hosts a number of Junior, youth, high school, and adult ice hockey games and tournaments, ice skating, and figure skating.

References

External links 
 Ice Line
 WCU Men's Hockey
 WCU Women's Hockey
 PSU-B Hockey
 Villanova Hockey
 ShinnyUSA - Lifetime Adult Hockey

Sports venues in Pennsylvania
College ice hockey venues in the United States
Indoor arenas in Pennsylvania
West Goshen Township, Chester County, Pennsylvania